Good Little Girls is a 1971 French film directed by Jean-Claude Roy.
The movie is a pastiche of Countess of Ségur's novel Les Petites Filles modèles matching comedy and erotism.

Plot
In the early 1970s, the Countess of Ségur's heroines have grown up. They are now teenagers with the usual preoccupations of their age. In the beautiful and peaceful area of Fleurville the good little girls (and their mothers) feel something is missing, which their girlish games cannot really fulfil; "a lack of men ..."

Cast
 Jessica Dorn : Madeleine de Fleurville
 Marie-Georges Pascal : Camille de Fleurville
 Cathy Reghin :  Marguerite de Rosbourg
 Sylvie Lafontaine : Sophie
 Michèle Girardon : Madame de Fleurville
 Bella Darvi : Madame de Rosbourg
 Béatrice Arnac : Madame Fichini
 François Guérin : doctor Luçon
 Nicole Isimat : Elise, the maid
 Pierre Moncorbier : Nicaise, the servant
 Vincent Gauthier : Julien, the yogi
 Romain Bouteille : Courpied
 Jean Franval : Pinko, the painter
 Dominique Paturel : Narrator (voice only)

DVD releases
DVD released in the UK in 2011 by Nucleus Films (French with English subtitles)

Bibliography 
 Christophe Bier, Dictionnaire des films français pornographiques et érotiques en 16 et 35 mm (Serious Publishing, 2011)

References

External links

Good little girls at Encyclo-ciné (French)
Pictures of Good little girls at Internet Movie Cars Database and at Encyclopedia of Lesbian Movie Scenes

1971 films
1970s French-language films
1970s sex comedy films
French sex comedy films
BDSM in films
Films about virginity
Films based on French novels
Films directed by Jean-Claude Roy
Teensploitation
1971 comedy films
1970s French films